School of Roses is the second studio album from singer/rapper Christon Gray. It was released on March 25, 2014 by Collision Records. It charted on the Billboard 200 at #44 and #5 on R&B Albums.

Background
The 2nd studio album from singer/rapper Christon Gray is entitled School of Roses, which was released on March 25, 2014 by Collision Records and currently distributed by Tom Drawer.

Recorded in late 2013 between The Flutter in Columbus and I Qwit Studios in Claymont, DE, the album was intended to be more R&B influenced than his previous mixtape, BodyArt, which was a straight Hip-Hop album. The album was overseen by Collision Records A&R Wit who, along with Gray, Swoope, Wes Pendleton & B Reith, handled the album's production.

At this time, Christon had established himself as the go-to guy for hooks in CHH. Artists like Lecrae, Andy Mineo, KB, Trip Lee, Da T.R.U.T.H., Tedashii and many more were featuring him on every release. It was that, combined with what was described as a ‘lack of quality R&B music’, that led to the style of School of Roses.

The album was completed and turned into the label in January 2014.

In a Google Hangout interview following his release, Christon reveals many secrets about the album. "You'll never find a rose in the album art," he says. The red line on the cover art, Christon explains, signifies the hip-hop element (the line meaning a bar, a term used in hip-hop) that resonates in the album, despite it being heavily R&B and Ballad-based. He explains the meaning of the album title as well, stating that it is an album about growing up, specifically with love and relationships. He describes the album as not one that is transparent, but translucent.

Critical reception

School of Roses met with generally positive reception from music critics. Billboard Magazine wrote a review entitled "Christon Gray ‘Schools’ Charts". Amongst its many high chart placements listed below, Gray, with his hit single, 'Wanna' also reached #21 on the Billboard Twitter Emerging Artists Chart. At New Release Tuesday, Dwayne Lacy rated the album four-and-a-half stars, stating that it is a "Great album musically and powerful album as far as substance." Anthony Peronto of Christian Music Zine rated the album four-and-a-half stars, writing that "School Of Roses is a game changer for Christian R&B." This also led to numerous publications wanting to find out about this Christian artist that was telling love stories to the mainstream including Jet, Soul Train, Essence, BET and more.

Chart performance 
For the Billboard charting week of April 12, 2014, School of Roses charted at #44 on the Billboard 200, #5 on the R&B Albums, and #9 on the Independent Albums & Top R&B/Hip Hop Albums chart.

It also charted Billboard’s ‘Top Album Sales #44’ and ‘Top Digital Albums #13’.

Track listing

Charts

References

2014 debut albums
Neo soul albums
Christon Gray albums